The Yamhill-Carlton AVA is an American Viticultural Area located in both Washington County and Yamhill County, Oregon. It is entirely contained within the Willamette Valley AVA, and surrounds the towns of Carlton and Yamhill. The mountain ridges surrounding the AVA form a horseshoe shape, and most of the vineyards are located on south-facing slopes. The region is in the rain shadow of the  Oregon Coast Range, a short distance to the west.

References

External links 
 Yamhill-Carlton website

American Viticultural Areas
Oregon wine
Geography of Washington County, Oregon
Geography of Yamhill County, Oregon
2004 establishments in Oregon